José Joaquín Pérez Mascayano (6 May 1801 – 1 July 1889) was a Chilean political figure. He served as the president of Chile between 1861 and 1871.

References 

1801 births
1889 deaths
Presidents of Chile
Chilean Ministers of the Interior
Chilean Ministers of Finance
Candidates for President of Chile
Chilean people of Basque descent
People of the Chincha Islands War
National Party (Chile, 1857) politicians
Presidents of the Senate of Chile
Instituto Nacional General José Miguel Carrera alumni